Dark Moor is a Spanish symphonic power metal band from Madrid. Formed in 1993, they produced three full-length albums before undergoing a line-up change in which three members left the band to form their own project, Dreamaker. Afterwards, the band continued under the same name, recruiting suitable replacements in time for their eponymous 2003 album. Since 2002, guitarist Enrik Garcia has been the band's sole remaining founding member.

Background
Dark Moor was formed in 1993 in Madrid, Spain, and recorded their debut album, Shadowland, in the summer of 1999. Dark Moor played live supporting Demons and Wizards on their Spanish tour.

Dark Moor began the recording sessions for their second album, The Hall of the Olden Dreams, in August 2000 at New Sin Studios with producer Luigi Stefanini. During these recording sessions, the band recorded their cover of "Halloween", which was included on the CD The Keepers of Jericho part I - A Tribute to Helloween (Arise Records).

Their EP The Fall of Melnibone was released in June 2001. This EP was a limited edition; 1500 copies were released and only for the Spanish market.

Dark Moor began the recording of their third album, The Gates of Oblivion, in Autumn 2001 at New Sin Studios. Dark Moor signed with the major label JVC for the Asian release. The band played 18 gigs at festivals such as Rock Machina, Viña Rock and Nit De Reis. After the first part of the tour, keyboardist Roberto Peña left the band and they were forced to finish the tour with a guest musician.

In August 2003 Dark Moor recorded four new exclusive acoustic tracks along with a string quartet, to be included in Between Light and Darkness, which was released in April 2003. Due to differing points of view regarding the musical direction for the next Dark Moor album, vocalist Elisa Martin, guitarist Albert Maroto and drummer Jorge Sáez decided to leave Dark Moor to start a new band.

The two remaining members of the band decided to start a search for new members. After the auditions, they accepted vocalist Alfred Romero, guitarist Jose Garrido, and drummer Andy C.

In August 2003, the band started recording their fourth album, Dark Moor, at New Sin Studios in Italy. Following a month of recording sessions, the album was mastered by Mika Jussila at Finnvox Studios.

On 23 November 2006, the band announced the departure of their drummer on their official website, due to "incompatibility with his other musical projects." He would go on to play drums for Saratoga. His replacement, Roberto Cappa, was previously in the Spanish metal band Anima Sola.

In January 2009, their seventh album Autumnal was released.

The band made an announcement on their website, dated 4 June 2010, that their eighth album was in the works. It featured Berenice Musa as a guest vocalist. The album is titled Ancestral Romance and it was released in November 2010.

On 18 June 2013 the band released their ninth album Ars Musica, with the Japanese limited version including a bonus CD with five bonus tracks. They toured Mexico and Asia the same year, as well as few dates in Europe in 2014 to support the new album.

Dark Moor started recording their 10th studio album, Project X, on 27 July 2015 and released it in Europe on 6 November 2015 on Scarlet Records.

On 21 July 2018, Enrik Garcia, guitarist and founder of the band, announced via Facebook that their next album would be called Origins and that, after the parenthesis they did with ufology themes on Project X, they would return to their habitual themes; Origins will be about the Celtic world, also adding Celtic instruments on their new songs. This album was released on 12 December 2018.

Members

Current members
 Alfred Romero (2003–present) - vocals
 Enrik Garcia (1993–present) - guitar
 Dani Fernandez (2004–2008, 2015–present) - bass
 Carlos Delgado (2021–present) - drums

Former members
 Javier Rubio (1993-1998) - guitar
 Iván Urbistondo (1996-1999) - vocals
 Roberto Peña (1994–2002) - keyboards
 Elisa C. Martin (1999–2003) - vocals
 Albert Maroto (1999–2003) - guitar
 Anan Kaddouri (1998–2004) - bass
 Jorge Sáez - (1998–2003) drums
 Jose Garrido (2003–2004) - guitar
 Jamie Mylles (2004-2006) - guitar
 Andy C. (2003–2006) - drums/keyboards
 Mario Garcia (2008–2015) - bass
 Ricardo Moreno (2015) - bass
 Roberto Cappa (2006–2021) - drums

Timeline

Discography

Studio albums
 Shadowland (1999)
 The Hall of the Olden Dreams (2000)
 The Gates of Oblivion (2002)
 Dark Moor (2003)
 Beyond the Sea (2005)
 Tarot (2007)
 Autumnal (2009)
 Ancestral Romance (2010)
 Ars Musica (2013)
 Project X (2015)
 Origins (2018)

Singles and EPs
 The Fall of Melnibone (2001)
 Between Light and Darkness (2003)
 From Hell (2003)
 The Road Again (2013)
 Birth of the Sun (2018)
 Vivaldi Summer Storm (2022)
 Héroe del Mar (2023)

Demos
 Dreams of Madness (1998)
 Flying (1999)

References

External links
 
 Dark Moor at AllMusic

 
1993 establishments in Spain
Musical groups established in 1993
Musical groups from Madrid
Musical quartets
Spanish power metal musical groups
Spanish symphonic metal musical groups
Scarlet Records artists